Tylomelania carbo is a species of freshwater snail with an operculum, an aquatic gastropod mollusk in the family Pachychilidae.

The sister group (the closest relative) of Tylomelania carbo is Tylomelania toradjarum.

Distribution 
This species occurs in lake Poso, Central Sulawesi, Indonesia. The type locality is lake Poso.

Description 
The shell has 4-5 whorls.

The width of the shell is up to 10.5 mm. The height of the shell is up to 16.5 mm. The width of the aperture is 6 mm. The height of the aperture is 9 mm.

The length of the radula can be up to 21.5 mm.

References

External links 
  Sarasin P. & Sarasin F. (1898). Die Süßwassermollusken von Celebes. Band 1. In: Sarasin P. & Sarasin F. (1898–1901). Materialien zur Naturgeschichte der Insel Celebes. Kreidel's Verlag, Wiesbaden. page 53, table 4, figure 50-51; tab. 8, fig. 112; tab. 9, fig. 116.

carbo
Gastropods described in 1897